The 1979 2. divisjon was a Norwegian second-tier football league season.

The league was contested by 24 teams, divided into two groups; A and B. Both groups consisted of 12 teams. The winners of group A and B were promoted to the 1980 1. divisjon. The second placed teams in group A and B met each other in a two-legged qualification round where the winner was promoted to 1. divisjon. The bottom three teams in both groups were relegated to the 3. divisjon.

Fredrikstad won group A with 34 points. Lyn won group B with 38 points. Both teams promoted to the 1980 1. divisjon. The second-placed teams, Pors and Molde met in the promotion play-offs. Molde defeated Pors with 7–0 on aggregate and won promotion.

Tables

Group A

Group B

Promotion play-offs

Results
Molde – Pors 3–0
Pors – Molde 0–4

Molde won 7–0 on aggregate. Molde was promoted to 1. divisjon.

References

Norwegian First Division seasons
1979 in Norwegian football
Norway
Norway